Renaldo Bothma (born 18 September 1989) is a South African-born Namibian rugby union footballer. He plays mostly as a flanker.

Career
In 2013, he was included in a South Africa President's XV team that played in the 2013 IRB Tbilisi Cup and won the tournament after winning all three matches.

He signed a deal to join English Premiership side Harlequins prior to the 2017–18 season, signing a three-year deal.

He made his Debut for Harlequins on 3 December 2017, against European Champions Saracens, in the Aviva Premiership.

Namibia
Qualifying for Namibia through his mother, Renaldo made his international debut in 2014 against Kenya.

References

External links

 

Living people
1989 births
South African rugby union players
Rugby union flankers
People from Alberton, Gauteng
Golden Lions players
White Namibian people
Namibian Afrikaner people
Afrikaner people
Namibian people of Dutch descent
South African people of Dutch descent
Pumas (Currie Cup) players
Leopards (rugby union) players
Namibian rugby union players
Namibia international rugby union players
Toyota Verblitz players
Expatriate rugby union players in Japan
Rugby union players from Gauteng
Sharks (rugby union) players
Blue Bulls players
Bulls (rugby union) players
Harlequin F.C. players
Tel Aviv Heat players
South African expatriate sportspeople in Israel
South African expatriate rugby union players
Expatriate rugby union players in Israel